Lucien Dahdah (15 August 1929 – 16 November 2003) was a Lebanese academic, businessman, media executive and politician, who served as foreign minister in 1975.

Early life and education
Dahdah was born on 15 August 1929. He was a graduate of American University of Beirut (AUB), Sorbonne University in Paris and Birmingham University. He graduated from AUB in 1949. He received a PhD from Sorbon and Birmingham universities.

Career
Dahdah worked as a university professor at his alma mater, AUB, teaching statistics and economics. Then he headed the board of directors of Intra Investment from 1970 to 1976 and from 1989 to 1993. He served as foreign minister in the interim cabinet led by Noureddine Rifai in 1975 under President Suleiman Frangieh. Dahdah was also advisor of Frangieh when the latter was serving as the president of Lebanon.

Dahdah was among the founding members of the Tele Orient channel. He also served as the director general of the channel. In addition, he founded the Radio Monte-Carlo-Moyen-Orient. Later he became the director of Middle East Economic Digest.

Personal life and death
Dahdah married twice and had a daughter. He died on 16 November 2003 at the age of 74.

References

External links

20th-century journalists
20th-century Lebanese businesspeople
20th-century scholars
1929 births
2003 deaths
Alumni of the University of Birmingham
American University of Beirut alumni
Academic staff of the American University of Beirut
Foreign ministers of Lebanon
Lebanese expatriates in France
Lebanese expatriates in the United Kingdom
Lebanese journalists
Lebanese Maronites
Lebanese media executives
University of Paris alumni